Algeria–Mali relations refers to bilateral relations between Algeria and Mali. Algeria maintains an embassy in Bamako and a consulate in Gao, while Mali has an embassy in Algiers.

The relationship between two countries, once former colonies of France, both share the Sahel desert as border, and also having a very long border, has made the relationship become a major obstacle for both two neighboring states. As two majority Sunni Muslim countries, recent instability in Mali, notably the Azawad of the Tuareg people has poured a large presence of al-Qaeda in the Islamic Maghreb and it has pushes Algeria into a difficult situation. To retaliate, Algeria fortified their border and deployed more troops to secure the border with Mali. The fear of growing militants from Mali brings Algeria and the United States to discuss on how to curb their extremist actions.

Algeria and Mali have been going further to diversify economic cooperation. Algeria has been a major investor to Mali, economically due to Algeria's economic progress and lesser poverty comparing to Mali.

Migration
Malian immigrants has formed at least 1% of Algerian population, and most live in coastal cities such as Oran, Constantine and Algiers, although Malians sometimes live in the South, notably in Tamanrasset and Adrar Provinces.

2012 seizure of Algerian consulate
During the Tuareg rebellion of 2012, the Algerian consulate was seized by at least two people wearing explosives belts. Seven hostages were taken, including the consul. In regards to Azawad's UDI, Algeria's Prime Minister has declared it would never "accept questioning Mali's territorial integrity" Algeria has planned to co-ordinate with MNLA to work towards freeing the hostages.

References

 
Mali
Bilateral relations of Mali